Nicolaj Damgaard Laegsgaard (born 18 November 1996) also known as Nicolaj Jørgensen is a Danish cricketer. In April 2018, he was named in Denmark's squad for the 2018 ICC World Cricket League Division Four tournament in Malaysia. He played in Denmark's third match of the tournament, against Malaysia.

Career
In September 2018, he was the most economical bowler in Group A of the 2018–19 ICC World Twenty20 Europe Qualifier tournament, with an economy rate of 2.85, and the leading wicket-taker for Denmark, with nine dismissals in five matches.

In September 2018, he was named in Denmark's squad for the 2018 ICC World Cricket League Division Three tournament in Oman. Ahead of the tournament, he was named as the player to watch in Denmark's squad. In May 2019, he was named in Denmark's squad for a five-match series against Leinster Lightning in Ireland, in preparation for the Regional Finals of the 2018–19 ICC T20 World Cup Europe Qualifier tournament in Guernsey. The same month, he was named in Denmark's squad for the Regional Finals qualification tournament. He made his Twenty20 International (T20I) debut for Denmark, against Jersey, on 16 June 2019. He was awarded Player of the match against Norway, in his second T20I.

In August 2019, he was named in Denmark's squad for the 2019 Malaysia Cricket World Cup Challenge League A tournament. He made his List A debut for Denmark, against Malaysia, in the Cricket World Cup Challenge League A tournament on 16 September 2019.

References

External links
 

1996 births
Living people
Danish cricketers
Denmark Twenty20 International cricketers
People from Herning Municipality
Sportspeople from the Central Denmark Region